Ivory Pyramid is a studio album by Jazz pianist Ramsey Lewis, released in 1992 on GRP Records. It peaked at #7 on the Billboard Contemporary Jazz Albums chart.

Critical reception

Geoffrey Himes of The Washington Post wrote: "The emphasis is on ballads this time, and Lewis's spare phrases evoke a pretty romanticism fleshed out by his fusion quintet."

Track listing

Personnel
Bass [electric, electric upright] – Charles Webb
Drums, percussion – Steve Cobb
Electric guitar, acoustic guitar – Henry Johnson
Keyboards [electric] – Mike Logan
Piano – Ramsey Lewis
Vocals – Abimelec Cruz, Brenda M. Stewart, Elizabeth Withers, Jamie O. Navarro, Jesse Stanford, Kevin C. James, Mario C. Johnson, Morris Stewart, Bobby Lewis, Shannon Tate, Sheila Fuller
Producers – Carl Griffin, Frayne Lewis, Ramsey Lewis

References

1992 albums
Ramsey Lewis albums
GRP Records albums